Princess Helena Adelaide of Schleswig-Holstein-Sonderburg-Glücksburg (1 June 1888 - 30 June 1962) was the third eldest daughter of Friedrich Ferdinand, Duke of Schleswig-Holstein and his wife Princess Karoline Mathilde of Schleswig-Holstein-Sonderburg-Augustenburg. She was a princess of Denmark through her marriage within the House of Schleswig-Holstein-Sonderburg-Glücksburg to Prince Harald of Denmark. Princess Helena was a Nazi sympathiser during World War II and was after the war exiled from Denmark, but eventually allowed to return, where she died.

Early life

Princess Helena was born 1 June 1888 at Grünholz Castle (Thumby) in Schleswig-Holstein, Prussia, the third eldest daughter of Frederick Ferdinand, Duke of Schleswig-Holstein-Sonderburg-Glücksburg and his wife Princess Karoline Mathilde of Schleswig-Holstein-Sonderburg-Augustenburg. Her mother was sister of Empress Augusta Victoria, making her sister in law of Wilhelm II, German Emperor and granddaughter of Princess Feodora of Leiningen, maternal half-sister of Queen Victoria. Her father was the eldest son of Friedrich, Duke of Schleswig-Holstein-Sonderburg-Glücksburg and a nephew of Christian IX of Denmark. Three years before the birth of Princess Helena, he had succeeded to the headship of the House of Schleswig-Holstein-Sonderburg-Glücksburg and the title of Duke upon the death of his father in 1885.

Marriage and issue

Princess Helena was engaged in 1908, and married Prince Harald of Denmark, fourth child and third son of Frederick VIII of Denmark and his wife Princess Louise of Sweden and Norway on 28 April 1909 at Glücksburg, Schleswig-Holstein, Germany.

After their marriage, Prince Harald and Princess Helena lived at the Jægersborghus country house north of Copenhagen which Prince Harald had purchased in 1907. Here their five children were born between 1910 and 1923.

The only activity deemed acceptable for a female member of the royal house except representation was charity, and in 1913, Princess Helena started a campaign to found an orphanage in Gentofte. The orphanage, Spædbørnshjemmet Danmark, was finally founded in 1923. After this, she acted as the protector of the orphanage and its funds, which was taken over by princess Caroline-Mathilde after her- the money was in 1977 to create the  Danmarksfonden, a fund for social and cultural matters.

Later life
Princess Helena became very unpopular during World War II because of her sympathy for the German occupation and the Nazi party after the German occupation of Denmark in 1940. The Danish resistance movement stated that Princess Helena was the only member of the Danish royal house to have betrayed Denmark: she received and entertained Germans in her home, attended parties hosted by the Germans at Gesandtskab and had been introduced to Danish collaborationists by the Danish noblewoman Ebba Lerche. Her actions were so unpopular that, on some occasions, enraged Danes had even broken the windows of her limousine. Because of her professed support for the Germans, she was reportedly not on speaking terms with her sons, who were embarrassed by her behaviour. Even her husband had taken to avoiding the dining room when she was hosting him. One of her own servants, Paul Dall, responsible for setting her table, was a contact of the German Abwehr in Copenhagen, and was after the war judged guilty as a spy.

On 18 January 1942 she participated in the memorial service for an SS officer, C.E. von Schalburg, who had died on the Russian front, a service which the monarch refused to attend. In 1942, Helena made efforts to convince Prince Knud of Denmark to persuade the monarch to allow Nazi members in to the Danish government.

Princess Helena is not considered to have been a regular German agent, but rather an informer and a contact on informal basis. After the war, owing to Princess Helena being a member of the Royal house, she was not brought to trial, as any punishment was at the discretion of the King. He instead exiled her from Denmark on 30 May 1945 and placed under house arrest at the Glücksburg Castle in Germany.

She was allowed to return to Denmark in 1947, when Prince Harald fell gravely ill. She stayed with her spouse until his death two years later. Prince Harald died on 30 March 1949 in Copenhagen. Princess Helena survived her husband by 13 years and died on 30 June 1962 in Hellerup, Denmark. She was buried at Roskilde Cathedral.

Issue
Helena and Harald had five children:

Ancestry

References

Citations

Bibliography

 

1888 births
1962 deaths
Helena Adelaide
Danish princesses
Helena Adelaide
People from the Province of Schleswig-Holstein
Danish collaborators with Nazi Germany
Burials at Roskilde Cathedral